Ophioglossum vulgatum, commonly known as adder's-tongue, southern adders-tongue or adders-tongue fern, is a species of fern in the family Ophioglossaceae.

The adder’s tongue fern is generally believed to have the largest number of chromosomes with 1262, compared to the human’s 46.

Distribution
It is native to many regions with a wide scattered distribution: throughout temperate through tropical Africa and throughout the temperate Northern Hemisphere in Europe, northeastern North America, temperate Asia, and Eurasia.

This small, hard-to-spot plant can occur singly in unimproved pastures, rock crevices and grassy path-sides, but also can occur in colonies of hundreds of plants in sand dunes.

Description
Ophioglossum vulgatum grows from a rhizome base to 10–20 cm tall (rarely to 30 cm). It consists of a two-part frond, separated into a rounded diamond-shaped sheath and narrow spore-bearing spike. The spike has around 10-40 segments on each side.

It reproduces by means of spores.

Rarity
This species is rare in most European countries. In Ukraine, there were recorded 280 loci: 152 before 1980, after 1980 – 120, as before and after 1980 – 8 locations.

Uses
Traditional European folk use of leaves and rhizomes as a poultice for wounds. This remedy was sometimes called the "Green Oil of Charity". A tea made from the leaves was used as a traditional European folk remedy for internal bleeding and vomiting.

Taxonomy
Linnaeus described adder's-tongue with the binomial Ophioglossum vulgatum in his Species Plantarum of 1753.

References
6. 
West Highland Flora (U.K.): Ophioglossum vulgatum

External links
USDA Plants Profile for Ophioglossum vulgatum

vulgatum
Ferns of the Americas
Ferns of Africa
Ferns of Asia
Ferns of Europe
Medicinal plants
Plants described in 1753
Taxa named by Carl Linnaeus